This is a list of the most important fjords of Greenland:

Fjords

 Alanngorsuaq Fjord 
 Aleqatsiaq Fjord
 Alluitsup Kangerlua (Lichtenau Fjord)
 Ameralik Fjord 
 Amerloq Fjord
 Ammassalik Fjord
 Ananap Kangertiva Kiateq
 Anaanap Kangertiva Oqqorseq (Depot Fjord)
 Anorituup Kangerlua
Kangikitsua
 Attertia
 Ardencaple Fjord
Bredefjord
Smallefjord
 Arfersiorfik Fjord
 Avaqqat Kangerluat
Puiattoq
Qassialik
 Bernstorff Fjord
 Bessel Fjord
 Bessel Fjord, NW Greenland
 Bowdoin Fjord
 Carlsberg Fjord (Kangerterajitta Itterterilaa)   
 Cass Fjord
 Danmark Fjord
 De Dodes Fjord
 Deichmann Fjord
 Dijmphna Sound
 Hekla Sound
 Eqalugaarsuit Fjord
 Fleming Fjord 
 Foulk Fjord
 Frederick E. Hyde Fjord
 Graah Fjord (Akorninnarmiit Oqqummut Kangertivat)
 Jaette Fjord
 Grandjean Fjord
 Granville Fjord
 Grevel Fjord
 Gyldenløve Fjord (Umiiviip Kangertiva)
 Hagen Fjord
 Hartz Sound
 Hellefjord
 Igtip Kangertiva (Comanche Bay)
 Igutsaat Fjord
 Ikerasak Fjord
 Ikersuaq (Bredefjord)
 Northern Sermilik
Qaleragdlit Imâ 
Kangerlua
 Ikersuaq, East Greenland (Ikertivaq)
 Eastern Tasiissaq
 Western Tasiissaq
 Ikertivaq (Ikersuaq)
 Ikertooq Fjord
Iliartalik
 Ilulissat Icefjord
Sikuiuitsoq
 Ingolf Fjord
 Iluileq Fjord (Danell Fjord)
 Isortoq Fjord
 J. A. D. Jensen Fjord
 J. C. Jacobsen Fjord
 Johan Petersen Fjord
 Kanajoorartuut Kangerluat
 Kangaamiut Kangerluarsuat Fjord
 Kangerlikajik
 Kangerluaraq 
 Kangerluarsuk Fjord
 Kangerluarsuk Tulleq
 Kangerluarsunnguaq Fjord
 Kangerluk Fjord
 Kangerluluk
 Kangerlussuaq Fjord
Kangerlussuaq Fjord, East Greenland
 Kangerlussuaq Fjord, Kangeq
 Kangerlussuaq Icefjord
 Kangerlussuatsiaq Fjord (Evighedsfjord)
 Kangersivartikajik (Kangerdluarssikajik)
Sammileq
 Kangertittivatsiaq
 Nordfjord
 Sammilik
 Karrat Fjord
 Kattertooq
 Kialernup Kangerlua
 Kivioq Fjord
 Knighton Fjord
 Kuutseq
 Qassit
 Lindeman Fjord 
Fligely Fjord
 Lindenow Fjord (Kangerlussuatsiaq)
 Norrearm
 Sondrearm
 MacCormick Fjord
 Miki Fjord
 Mørkefjord
 Nansen Fjord
 Nanûseq Fjord (Annikitsup Kangerlua)
Noret
 Napasorsuaq Fjord (Napasorsuup Kangerlua)
 Nasaussap Saqqaa
 Nathorst Fjord
 Nattoralik
 Newman Fjord
 Nigertuluk
 Nioghalvfjerd Fjord
 Nordre Isortoq Fjord
 Nuup Kangerlua
 Nuussuup Kangia
 Paatusoq
 Perlerfiup Kangerlua
 Petermann Fjord
 Poulsen Fjord
 Quseertaliip Kangertiva
 Romer Fjord
 Ryberg Fjord
 Saqqarsuaq Fjord
 Savary Fjord
 Sehested Fjord (Uummannap Kangertiva)
 Annat Fjord
 Sikuijuitsoq
 Sermilik (Sermiligaaq)
 Sherard Osborn Fjord
 Sikuijivitteq (Mogens Heinesen Fjord)
 Siorapaluup Kangerlua (Robertson Fjord)
 Southern Sermilik
 St George Fjord
 Sullua Fjord
 Tasermiut Fjord
 Tasersuatsiaq Fjord
 Torsukattak Fjord (Disko Bay)
 Tunulliarfik Fjord
Qooroq Fjord
 Tuttilik
 Ukkusissat Fjord
 Upernavik Icefjord
 Uummannaq Fjord
 Uunartoq Fjord
 Vahl Fjord
 Vedel Fjord
 Wolstenholme Fjord

Fjord areas

 Godthab Gulf
 Loch Fyne
Wordie Bay (Greenland)
 Copeland Fjord
 Granta Fjord
 Young Sound
Tyrolerfjord
 Independence Fjord
Astrup Fjord
Jørgen Brønlund Fjord
 Hagen Fjord
 Inglefield Bredning
Bowdoin Fjord 
Academy Fjord 
Olrik Fjord 
 Iittuarmiit (Southern Skjoldungen Fjord)
 Balder Fjord
 Halvdan Fjord
 Yrsas Fjord
 Pulaqqaviip Ikaasaa (Morkesund)
 Qimutuluittiip Kangertiva (Northern Skjoldungen Fjord)
 Hermod Vig
 Norrevig
 Kaiser Franz Joseph Fjord
Dusenfjord
Geologfjord
Isfjord
Kjerulffjord
Nordfjord
Muskox Fjord
 Kangerlussuaq Fjord, East
 Amdrup Fjord
 Courtauld Fjord
 Nordfjord
 Watkins Fjord
 Kangersuneq
 Dragsfjord
 Fylla Vig
 Magne Fjord
 Mode Fjord
 Kangertittivatsiaq
 Arpertilo (Vestfjord)
 Nordfjord
 Sammilik
 King Oscar Fjord
 Antarctic Sound
 Sofia Sound 
 Kempe Fjord
Dickson Fjord
Rohs Fjord
Rhedin Fjord
 Narwhal Sound 
Segelsällskapet Fjord
Alpefjord
Forsbladfjord
Antarctic Haven
 Skeldal 
 Vega Sound
 Davy Sound
 Peary Land
 Benedict Fjord
De Long Fjord
Thomas Thomsen Fjord
Adolf Jensen Fjord
O.B. Bøggild Fjord
 Frederick E. Hyde Fjord
Citronen Fjord
Freja Fjord
Frigg Fjord
Odin Fjord
 Thor Fjord
 G.B. Schley Fjord
Ormen
 Gardiner Fjord
 Hellefiske Fjord
 Hunt Fjord
 J.P. Koch Fjord
Navarana Fjord
 Jewell Fjord
 Lemming Fjord
 Mascart Sound
 Nordenskiöld Fjord
 Sands Fjord
 Victoria Fjord
 Weyprecht Fjord
Conger Sound
Harder Fjord
 Prince Christian Sound
Kangerluk Fjord 
Ikeq Fjord 
Akuliarutsip Imaa (Ikerasak Fjord)
Ilua Fjord
Torsukattak Fjord
Utoqqarmiut Fjord (Pamialluup Kujatinngua) 
 Scoresby Sound
 Fonfjord
 Rode Fjord
 Vestfjord
 Gaasefjord
 Hurry Inlet
 Ofjord
 Hare Fjord
 Rype Fjord
 Snesund
 Nordvestfjord
 Flyver Fjord
 Sermilik
Johan Petersen Fjord
Stoklund Fjord
Helheim Fjord
Ningerti
 Skaer Fjord
Penthievre Fjord
 H.G. Backlundfjord
C.F.Mourier Fjord
V. Clausen Fjord
 Timmiarmiut Fjord
 Ernineq Fjord
 Hanseraq Fjord
Igtâsiartikajîp Kangertiva
 Navfalik Fjord
Tajarnikajîp Kangertiva

Landlocked fjords
Agnete Lake  (Agnete Sø)
Annex Lake (Annekssøen)
Centrum Lake (Centrumsø)
Elizabeth Sharon Lake (Elizabeth Sharon Sø)
Romer Lake (Romer Sø)
Seal Lake (Sælsøen)

See also
Ammassalik wooden maps
List of glaciers in Greenland

References

External links

 
Lists of landforms of Greenland
Greenland
Coasts of Greenland